El Carmelo Hotel was Pacific Grove's first hotel, opened to guests on May 20, 1887. It was sometimes called the sister of the Hotel Del Monte. It was located on Lighthouse Avenue between Fountain and Grand Avenues, Pacific Grove and owned by the Pacific Improvement Company (PIC). In 1907, the name of the hotel changed to the Pacific Grove Hotel. In 1917, the PIC decided to dismantle it and use the wood in the reconstruction of The Lodge at Pebble Beach, California that had burned down on December 17, 1917. The empty block was sold to W. R. Holman in 1919 to open the Holman Department Store.

History

The Carmelo hotel was built by the Pacific Improvement Company (PIC) in 1887 soon after the Hotel Del Monte was destroyed by fire on April 1, 1887. The building was three stories high and included an attic. It contained 114 rooms, an elevator, and an attached large restaurant and dining room. It included six cottages that were across the street on Grand Avenue, built in 1883. The hotel's water was provided by the Carmel River. It had its own power plan and used gas lights manufactured on the premises. Rooms were advertised at $2 a day and $10 to $12 per week. It could accommodate up to 185 guests. Hotel guests could share the use of the Hotel Del Monte's golf course and other privileges.

El Carmelo comes from the Spanish name, El Rio de Carmelo, given to the Carmel River by Spanish explorer Sebastián Vizcaíno shortly before he landed in Monterey Bay in December 1602. In 1889, Another hotel with the same Spanish name was built by real estate developer and early pioneer Santiago J. Duckworth, in Carmel-by-the-Sea. It was the city's first hotel, Hotel Carmelo. He later renamed the hotel the "Pine Inn."

In June 1893, the El Carmelo hotel was renovated for the summer season. The hotel was directly across a park (now Jewell Park), had front gardens, tennis courts, and park benches. In addition, PIC provided tents to rent at $2.25 a week and a camping ground for $1 a week. Lectures at the Chautauqua Hall in Pacific Grove were on the arranged program of events near the hotel.

In April 1907, after twenty years, the hotel's name was changed to the Pacific Grove Hotel. The name was changed to avoid confusion with the Hotel Carmelo and to advertise the town of Pacific Grove.

On September 25, 1909, the PIC closed the hotel because it was losing money on the hotel. It was reopened in early 1910. That same year, the PIC began an electric automobile service from the Pacific Grove Hotel to The Lodge at Pebble Beach, California in forty-five minutes. In 1918, the PIC decided to sell the hotel, which fell through. They decided to dismantle it and the wood used in the reconstruction of The Lodge at Pebble Beach, that burned down on December 17, 1917. The Pacific Grove Hotel's empty block was sold to W. R. Holman in 1919 for $10,000. In 1921, the Holman Department Store opened an auto repair garage and parts store at the same location.

See also
 List of hotels in the United States

References

External links

 The Holman Website
 Pacific Grove
 Pebble Beach

Hotels in California
Hotel buildings completed in 1887
Hotels established in 1887
1887 establishments in California